The Duchess of Seven Dials is a 1920 British silent romance film directed by Fred Paul and starring Cecil Mannering, Marjorie Hume and Adelaide Grace. Its plot involves a young aristocratic woman who falls in love with a curate doing charitable work in the Seven Dials area of Central London. It was made by the London Film Company.

Cast
 Cecil Mannering as Reverend Moel Fortescue 
 Marjorie Hume as Lady Irene Worth 
 Adelaide Grace as Grace Milton 
 Daphne Grey as Melia 
 Teddy Arundell as Joe Murden 
 Henry Paulo as Duke of Fivepence 
 George Turner as Spivy 
 Hubert Willis as Lord Sloane 
 Cyril Percival as Lord Marcus 
 Daisy Elliston

References

External links

1920 films
British silent feature films
Films directed by Fred Paul
1920s romance films
Films set in London
British romance films
British black-and-white films
1920s English-language films
1920s British films
English-language romance films